Manual of Love  is a 2005  Italian blockbuster romantic comedy film in four quartets. It was directed by  Giovanni Veronesi, who made two sequels, Manuale d'amore 2 – Capitoli successivi in 2007, and Manuale d'amore 3 in 2011.

Plot
Each of the four episodes follows a different couple, focusing on a particular stage of a typical love relationship:

Innamoramento (falling in love): Giulia and Tommaso (Jasmine Trinca and  Silvio Muccino) meet by chance. He falls in love on the spot; although initially Giulia doesn't return his sentiments, a romantic dinner leads the relationship to bloom and develop into an actual marriage proposal.

Crisi (crisis): Barbara and Marco (Margherita Buy and Sergio Rubini) are a couple going through a crisis, close to divorce. She is the stereotypical wife, full of initiative which her husband does not share. He on the other hand gets more and more boring in his routine.

Tradimento (cheating): A traffic police woman named Ornella (Luciana Littizzetto) is cheated on by her husband and takes revenge on all other drivers. Her severity and strict enforcement of all regulations builds her a reputation in Rome. Eventually she too has an extra-conjugal affair, after which marriage and wife get back together.

Abbandono (break-up): Goffredo (Carlo Verdone) is a rich doctor abandoned by his wife Margherita. After many attempts to win back her love, Goffredo gives up. When Goffredo's desperation has reachest the darkest point, he meets Livia, Tommaso's sister. They open up to each others as good friends, and the movie ends with the duo going for a walk on the beach, awaiting for a date which for both seems a promising development in their life.

The characters in the movie are all related in one way or another, and each transition brings background characters from a previous episode to be the protagonists of the next episode. The film is set in Rome.

Cast
Carlo Verdone: Goffredo
Luciana Littizzetto: Ornella
Silvio Muccino: Tommaso
Sergio Rubini: Marco
Margherita Buy: Barbara
Jasmine Trinca: Giulia
Rodolfo Corsato: Alberto Marchese
Dino Abbrescia: Gabriele
Dario Bandiera: Piero
Luis Molteni: avvocato di Goffredo
Sabrina Impacciatore: Luciana
Anita Caprioli: Livia
Francesco Mandelli: Dante

Awards
2 Nastro d'Argento: Best Supporting Actor (Carlo Verdone), Best Screenplay.
2 David di Donatello Best Supporting Actor (Carlo Verdone), Best Supporting Actress (Margherita Buy).

External links 
 
 

2005 films
2000s Italian-language films
2005 romantic comedy films
Italian anthology films
Films set in Italy
Italian romantic comedy films
Films directed by Giovanni Veronesi
Films with screenplays by Vincenzo Cerami
2000s Italian films